Hejdandasht Rural District is a rural district (dehestan) in Salehabad District, Mehran County, Ilam Province, Iran. At the 2006 census, its population was 1,925, in 396 families.  The rural district has 13 villages.

References 

Rural Districts of Ilam Province
Mehran County